John George Langridge MBE (10 February 1910 – 27 June 1999) was a cricketer who played for Sussex. His obituary in Wisden called him "one of the best English cricketers of the 20th century never to play a Test match".

Born into a cricketing family at Newick, north of Lewes, John Langridge followed his elder brother James into the Sussex side in 1928 and stayed there until he retired in 1955. In between, he scored more than 34,000 runs as an opening batsman and made 76 centuries, and was a Wisden Cricketer of the Year in 1950. Considered unlucky not to have earned a place in the national team, only Alan Jones of Glamorgan has scored more runs but not played for his country, and no one who scored as many centuries as Langridge failed to win international recognition. In addition, Langridge took 784 catches, mostly at slip, including 69 in his last season at the age of 45; only five players have taken more catches in a career or in a season.

Langridge became a first-class umpire on retirement and stood in seven Test matches and eight One Day Internationals. He was appointed an MBE for services to cricket.

See also
 List of Test cricket umpires
 List of One Day International cricket umpires

References

External links
 

1910 births
1999 deaths
English cricketers
North v South cricketers
Players cricketers
Sussex cricketers
Wisden Cricketers of the Year
English Test cricket umpires
English One Day International cricket umpires
Members of the Order of the British Empire
People from Newick
English cricketers of 1919 to 1945